Cytophagaceae is a family of bacteria.

References

Cytophagia